The Qiyang dialect is a dialect of Xiang Chinese spoken in Qiyang County, Hunan province.

Tones
The Qiyang dialect is quite unusual in that it is reported to have two "double contour" tones, high and low fall–rise–fall, or perhaps high fall – low fall and low fall – high fall: the entering tones yin qu (陰去)  (4232) and yang qu (陽去)  (2142). However, phonetically the pitch of a syllable depends on the voicing of the initial consonant, so these are phonemically a single tone. Moreover, the final fall of the yin qu tone is "not perceptually relevant", so it may be that 'dipping' (for yin qu) and 'peaking' (for yang qu) are a sufficient categorization.

References

Wei Hu, 2011. "Production and Perception of Double Contour Tones in Qiyang Chinese". Presented at the 17th International Congress of Phonetic Sciences.

Qiyang
Xiang Chinese